Louis Lundgren (24 April 1901 – 26 September 1976) was a Danish sprinter. He competed in the men's 400 metres at the 1928 Summer Olympics.

References

External links
 

1901 births
1976 deaths
Athletes (track and field) at the 1924 Summer Olympics
Athletes (track and field) at the 1928 Summer Olympics
Danish male sprinters
Danish male hurdlers
Olympic athletes of Denmark